Shahrom Tagoymurodovich Samiev (born 8 February 2001) is a Tajik professional football player who currently plays for Zimbru Chișinău.

Career

Club
On 14 February 2020, Istiklol announced that Samiev had left the club to join Rubin Kazan on a free transfer. For 2020–21 season, a new limit of 8 foreign players was introduced in the Russian Premier League, and was not registered by the club with the league.

On 17 August 2020, Samiev left Rubin Kazan to sign for Sheriff Tiraspol, and was immediately loaned out to fellow Divizia Națională club Dinamo-Auto Tiraspol until the end of the year.

On 2 July 2021, Samiev left Sheriff Tiraspol and signed for Belarusian Premier League club Torpedo-BelAZ Zhodino.

On 24 July 2022, Samiev left joined fellow Belarusian Premier League club Isloch Minsk.

International
Samiev made his senior team debut on 7 June 2019, scoring the equaliser in a 1-1 draw against Afghanistan.

Career statistics

Club

International

Statistics accurate as of match played 25 September 2022

International goals
Scores and results list Tajikistan's goal tally first.

Honours
Istiklol
 Tajik League (1): 2019
 Tajik Cup (1): 2019
Tajik Supercup (1): 2019

Tajikistan
King's Cup: 2022

References

External links
 
 

2001 births
Living people
Tajikistani footballers
Association football forwards
Tajikistan international footballers
FC Istiklol players
FC Rubin Kazan players
FC Sheriff Tiraspol players
FC Dinamo-Auto Tiraspol players
FC Torpedo-BelAZ Zhodino players
FC Isloch Minsk Raion players
FC Zimbru Chișinău players
Moldovan Super Liga players
Tajikistan Higher League players
Tajikistani expatriate footballers
Expatriate footballers in Russia
Tajikistani expatriate sportspeople in Russia
Expatriate footballers in Moldova
Tajikistani expatriate sportspeople in Moldova
Expatriate footballers in Belarus